Midnight Movies is the debut studio album by the American indie rock band, Midnight Movies. It was released on August 31, 2004 through Emperor Norton Records.

Track listing

Credits
Midnight Movies
Gena Olivier – lead vocals, drums, organ 
Jason Hammons – keyboards
Larry Schemel – guitars, bass guitar 
Additional personnel
Diego Miralles - cello (track 8)
Probyn Gregory - horn (track 8)
Fulton Dingley - engineering, production, mixing
Joe Gastwirt - mastering
Jason Maston - engineering
Alex Bush - engineering
Matt Brown - engineering

References

2004 albums